Stoughton High School is a public high school in Stoughton, Wisconsin. It is part of the Stoughton School District.

Extracurricular activities

Athletics 
Athletic teams include:
 Boys' and girls' cross country
 Boys' and girls' golf
 Boys' and girls' soccer
 Boys' and girls' swimming
 Boys' and girls' tennis
 Boys' and girls' basketball
 Boys' and girls' hockey
 Football
 Wrestling
 Volleyball
 Spirit squad
 Baseball
 Lacrosse
 Softball
 Track and field

Clubs and organizations 
Student clubs and organizations include:
 Art club
 Badminton club
 Book club
 Chess/gaming club
 Environmental club
 Forensics
 German club
 GSA
 History-archaeology club
 Jazz band
 Key club
 Math team
 Mock trial
 NHS
 Newspaper
 Quiz bowl
 Science team
 Spanish club
 FFA
 Ultimate frisbee
 Yearbook

Notable alumni
Ella Giles Ruddy (1851–1917), author, editor
James Allen Johnson (1924–2016), U.S. Army engineer and major general
Russ Hellickson (1948 – ), amateur wrestler, collegiate wrestling coach, and Olympian

See also
 List of high schools in Wisconsin

References 

Public high schools in Wisconsin
Education in Dane County, Wisconsin